The Ambassador is an automobile manufactured and marketed by American Motors Corporation (AMC) from 1957 through 1974 over eight generations, available in two- and four-door sedan, two-door hardtop, four-door station wagon as well as two-door convertible body styles. It was classified as a full-size car from 1957 through 1961, mid-size from 1962 until 1966, and again full-size from 1967 through 1974 model years.

When discontinued, the Ambassador nameplate had been used from 1927 until 1974, the longest continuously-used car nameplate until then. The Ambassador nameplate was used variously as the Ambassador V-8 by Rambler, Rambler Ambassador, and finally AMC Ambassador. Previously, the nameplate Ambassador applied to Nash's full-size cars. The nameplate referred to a trim level between 1927 and 1931.

Ambassadors were continuously manufactured at AMC's Lake Front plant in Kenosha, Wisconsin until 1974, as well as at AMC's Brampton Assembly in Brampton, Ontario between 1963 and 1966. Australian Motor Industries (AMI) assembled Ambassadors from knock-down kits with right-hand drive from 1961 until 1963. The U.S. fifth-generation Ambassadors were manufactured by Industrias Kaiser Argentina (IKA) in Córdoba, Argentina from 1965 until 1972, as well as assembled by ECASA in Costa Rica from 1965 through 1970. Planta REO assembled first-generation Ambassadors in Mexico at its Monterrey, Nuevo León plant. Fifth- and seventh-generation Ambassadors were modified into custom stretch limousines in Argentina and the U.S.

Development 

Following George W. Mason's unexpected death in the fall of 1954, George Romney (whom Mason had been grooming as his eventual successor), succeeded him as president and CEO of the newly formed American Motors. Romney recognized that to be successful in the postwar marketplace, an automobile manufacturer would have to be able to produce and sell cars in sufficient volume to amortize the high cost of tooling. Toward that end, he set out to increase AMC's market share with its Rambler models that were selling in market segment in which the domestic Big Three (General Motors, Ford Motor Company, and Chrysler) automakers did not yet compete. While the development of a redesigned 1958 Nash Ambassador, based on a stretched and reskinned 1956 Rambler body was almost complete, AMC's designers were also working on a retrimmed Hudson equivalent, called Rebel, to offer Hudson dealers.

However, as sales of the large-sized Nash Ambassador and Hudson Hornet models slowed, it became clear to Romney that consumer confidence in the historic Nash and Hudson nameplates had collapsed. Reluctantly, he decided that 1957 would be the end of both nameplates, and the company would concentrate on the new Rambler line, which was registered as a separate marque for 1957.

The market positioning meant that "the AMC Ambassador was a car with no real competitors throughout most of the sixties" because it was viewed as a luxury-type car and could be put against the higher-end large-sized models from the domestic Big Three automakers, but the Ambassador was more of a midsized car.

First generation

1958 

American Motors planned to produce a stretched a  wheelbase version of the Rambler platform for Nash dealers to be the new Nash Ambassador and another for Hudson dealers. Shortly before committing to production of the new long-wheelbase versions of the Hudson and the Nash, CEO Romney decided to abandon the Nash and Hudson marques.

Despite the fact that the Nash and Hudson names were canceled, work on the car itself continued, and American Motors introduced debuted in the fall of 1957, the 1958 "Ambassador V-8 by Rambler" on a  wheelbase.

Although AMC's 327 CID V8 shares its displacement with the Chevrolet small-block, AMC's 327 came out six years before Chevrolet first offered its 327 in 1962.

The Ambassador was available in a body style exclusive to its line, a pillarless hardtop Cross Country station wagon. The 1958 Ambassador was offered in a single high-level trim level and came equipped with such luxury items as an electric clock, twin front and rear ashtrays, Nash's traditional "deep coil" spring suspension front and rear, split-back reclining front seats that fold down into a bed, as well as upscale fabrics for the interior.

Management had found that the public associated the Rambler name with small economy cars, and did not want the upscale nature of the new Ambassador to be so closely associated with Rambler's favorable, but economical image. Therefore, a decision was made that the larger Ambassador would be marketed as the Ambassador V-8 by Rambler in order to identify it with the Rambler name's burgeoning success, but to indicate an air of exclusivity by showing it to be a different kind of vehicle. However, the car wore "Rambler Ambassador" badges on its front fenders.

The 1958 Ambassador is a substantially longer car than the  wheelbase Rambler Six and Rebel V8, although both lines shared the same basic body, styling, and visual cues. However, all of the Ambassador's extra  of wheelbase (and, therefore, overall length) were added ahead of the cowl, meaning that the passenger compartment had the same volume as the smaller Ramblers. The Ambassadors came with plusher interior and exterior trims while the front end incorporated the Rebel "V-Line" grille from the prototype Hudson model. Through effective market segmentation, the Ambassador was positioned to compete with the larger models offered by other automakers.

Model identification was located on the car's front fenders and deck lid. Super trim level Ambassadors featured painted side trim in a color that complimented the body color; Custom models featured a silver anodized aluminum panel on sedans and vinyl woodgrain decals on station wagons. Ambassador body styles included a four-door sedan and a hardtop sedan, a four-door pillared station wagon, and the aforementioned hardtop station wagon, a body style that first saw duty as an industry first in the 1956 Nash and Hudson Rambler line, on which all of the 1958 Ramblers were based.

The Ambassador had an excellent power-to-weight ratio for its time and provided spirited performance with 0 to 60 mph (0 to 97 km/h) times of less than 10-seconds, and low 17-second times through a quarter-mile (402 m) dragstrip. It could be equipped with a limited slip differential, as well as power brakes, power steering, power windows, and air conditioning. Numerous safety features (such as deep-dished steering wheels and padded dashboards) came standard, while lap seat belts were optional.

1959 
For 1959, the Ambassador received a revised grille, side trim, and redesigned rear door skins that swept into the tailfins instead of terminating at the C-pillar. Scotchlite reflectors were also added to the rear of the tailfins to increase visibility at night. Front and rear bumpers were over 20% thicker and featured recessed center sections to protect license plates. Adjustable headrests were now available as an option for the front seats, an industry first. AMC touted the added comfort the headrests provided, as well as their potential for reducing whiplash injuries in the event of a rear-end collision. Other changes included the activation of the starter through the neutral pushbutton (on automatic transmission-equipped cars), and the addition of an optional "Powr-Saver" engine fan, which featured a fluid-filled clutch for quieter high-speed operation.

The 1959 model year also saw the addition of an optional "Air-Coil Ride" air suspension system, utilizing airbags installed within the rear coil springs. An engine-driven compressor, reservoir, and ride-height control valve comprised the rest of the system, but as other automakers discovered, the troublesome nature of air-suspension outweighed its benefits. The option proved to be unpopular and was discontinued at the end of the model year.

Ambassador sales improved considerably over 1958, reaching an output of 23,769; nearly half of which were Custom four-door sedans. Less popular was the hardtop station wagon, of which 578 were built.

Second generation

1960 

The decision to discontinue the respected names of Nash and Hudson resulted in the development of the second-generation Rambler Ambassador design. It was the only American midsize, luxury high-performance car offered in 1960. The "Ambassador by Rambler" was marketed by AMC as America's Compact Luxury Car.

The 1960 model year lineup was totally reskinned, using new fenders, hood, deck lid, door skins, roofline, grille, taillights, bumpers, windshield, and backlight. Significant were the lower hood line, lower windshield cowl, simplified side trims, and egg-crate grille with stand-up letters spelling AMBASSADOR, while the tailfins were reduced in height and were canted to either side making for an integrated appearance, and the AMBASSADOR name repeated across the rear trunk lid. The overall effect was rather fresh, as the new roof had a lower, lighter look, to complement the lower fins and grille. The design changes and the new grille provided "a more expensive look".

The 1960 Ambassador was available only with four doors in sedan and station wagon body types. The station wagons were available with two rows of seats for six adult passengers or with an additional rear-facing third row for an eight-passenger version. Additionally, a pillarless (hardtop) sedan, as well as a station wagon, were available in the top-of-the-line "Custom" trim version. Three trim levels started with a "Deluxe" sedan that was reserved for fleet customers. The "Super" was the entry-level consumer version and available only as a pillared sedan and pillared six- or eight-passenger station wagon body styles. The top "Custom" trim models in both pillared or hardtop versions included fender ornaments, a clock, full wheel covers as well as additional padding for the rear seat, dash, and sun visors. To enhance the visual length of the cars, a full-length bodyside molding was painted in a contrasting color on the Super trim models or enclosed a brushed aluminum panel on the Ambassador Custom series.

Ambassadors now came with a unique compound curved windshield that cut into the roof. This improved visibility, did away with the "knee knocker" dogleg design of AMC's first-generation wrap-around windshield, and resulted in an even stiffer unitized structure. The 1960 Ambassador had a low cowl, which with the compound windshield, afforded excellent visibility. All 1960 Ambassadors came with a new instrument cluster under a padded cowl, as well as illuminated controls for lights, wipers, fan, and defrost functions. Additional conveniences included a spotlight on the accelerator pedal and a net above the padded sun visors to hold lightweight items. The top-of-the-line Ambassador Custom models came standard with individual "airliner" reclining front seats that now had even more luxurious fabrics than in previous years.

All Ambassadors included the AMC's  V8, but for the first time, it was available in two versions. First was the original ,  of torque, performance version equipped with the 4-barrel carburetor and a 9.7:1 compression ratio, which required premium fuel, and a second economy version running on regular gasoline making ,  of torque, equipped with a 2-barrel carburetor and an 8.7:1 compression ratio. The 1960 Ambassadors continued with an independent front suspension with upper and lower A-arms, an enclosed drive shaft (torque tube) with a live rear axle using 4-link trailing arms, and coil springs at all four wheels, although the suspension was revised resulting in better handling.

Equipped with the   V8, and the BorgWarner pushbutton-operated three-speed planetary gear and torque converter automatic transmission, the Ambassadors reached  in just over 9 seconds and passed the quarter-mile in 17 seconds. The Ambassadors featured soft springs and a solid build making them ride silently and smoothly according to reviewers.

The year set a new record for AMC with total production reaching almost half a million cars and total revenue exceeding $1 billion. The Rambler Six and V8 along with the Rambler American represented almost 95% of AMC's automobile sales. A total of 23,798 Ambassadors were built for the 1960 model year with the Custom sedan being the most popular body and trim version (10,949 units). Only 302 Deluxe (fleet) sedans were delivered.

1961 

The 1961 Ambassador continued the previous year's  basic unitized platform, but received an unusual new front-end styling that was overseen by AMC's in-house design department headed by Edmund E. Anderson. The pillar-less four-door hardtop sedan and station wagon models were no longer available for 1961.

The Ambassador's new design consisted of a trapezoid grille and headlights that floated in a body-colored panel, while the front fenders arched downward and forward of the leading edge of the hood. Different from anything else on the market, AMC's marketing department promoted the look as "European". While the new look was meant to distinguish the Ambassador from the lower-priced Ramblers, it was neither a consumer success nor well-received in the automotive press. Moreover, overall automobile industry sales fell as the entire U.S. economy was experiencing the recession of 1960–1961.

Standard was the   V8 with a synchromesh manual transmission. Optional was the  "power pack" version with dual exhaust system featuring new ceramic-coated mufflers guaranteed for the life of the car.

The 1961 Pure Oil Company Economy Trials, which were designed to closely parallel everyday driving experiences, saw the Ambassador capture 9 of the first 10 places in the V8 engine category as well as winning the top of its class.

Third generation

1962 
By the 1962 model year, the Ambassador's platform was in its fifth season on the market. While Rambler sales had been good enough for third place in industry sales (behind Chevrolet and Ford), AMC's management was working on a revolutionary and somewhat costly design set to debut for the 1963 model year. In the meantime, American Motors needed to save money, and since the Ambassador's sales had fallen in 1961, it was decided that the car would be downsized for 1962 to directly share the body, windshield, and  wheelbase with the Classic platform. Accordingly, the car was marketed as a Rambler Ambassador.

All Ambassadors included AMC's  V8 engine while the Rambler Classic models were limited to I6 engines. The standard V8, was available either the regular fuel, 2-barrel carburetor and 8.7:1 compression ratio,  version or the premium gasoline, 4-barrel version with 9.7:1 compression ratio producint . The  wheelbase 1962 Ambassador was lighter than its  wheelbase predecessors and was a spirited performer with the   V8. This was like the 1957 Rambler Rebel, which was the quickest 4-door sedan made in the United States that year, achieving  acceleration in just over 7 seconds and making it faster than the Hemi Chrysler 300C, the DeSoto Adventurer, the Dodge D500, the Plymouth Fury, and the Chevrolet fuel-injected 283. The 1962 Ambassador was basically the same vehicle and should also reach 60 mph about as quickly as did the 1957 Rambler Rebel.

The 1962 Ambassador received a new front end that was very similar to the 1961–1962 Classic's, but with a crosshatch design, recessed center section, and Ambassador lettering. New, rectangular taillights were seen at the ends of restyled rear fenders, which lost their fins entirely. The exterior trim was reshuffled, and a new 2-door pillared sedan debuted. A new '400' trim line was added at the top of the line, with Super and Custom models remaining. The Ambassador offered even more luxurious interiors to differentiate it from the Rambler Classic. The 400 could be had with vinyl bucket seats, headrests, and color-coordinated shag carpets.

The 1962 Ambassador came with a dual chamber master brake cylinder that separated the front and rear brakes so that in the event of the failure of one chamber some braking function would remain. This design was offered by only a few cars at that time. The 1962 models were equipped with "Walker" (brand) flow-through mufflers as well as a ceramic-coated exhaust system.

Dealer-installed options included rear fender skirts and a tow hitch.

In 1962, George Romney is inaugurated as the new governor of Michigan and in February, Roy Abernethy becomes CEO. A grand total of 36,171 Rambler Ambassadors were built for 1952 and AMC drops from third to fourth place in total U.S. industry sales for the year.

Fourth generation

1963 

In 1962 Romney resigned from AMC to run for Governor of Michigan, a position that he won. The automaker's new president, Roy Abernethy, who was responsible for the increasing sales under Romney, reacted to the mounting competition (in 1963 AMC built as many cars as they had in 1960, but overall total car sales had increased so much that it gave the automaker sixth place in domestic production; the same output in 1960 had put them third) in a logical way: "Let's get rid of this Romney image."

A completely redesigned larger Rambler lineup appeared. The new cars continued the philosophy of building smaller cars than its larger "Big Three" competitors, but also had a high degree of interchangeability in parts to keep tooling costs and production complexity to a minimum. The automaker, which pioneered "styling continuity", introduced all-new styling for the 1963 model year Ambassadors and claimed that these were "functional changes .... not change just for the sake of change". The Ambassadors featured a  longer wheelbase, but were  shorter due to reduced front and rear body overhangs, as well as a  drop in overall height.

Designed by Dick Teague, the 1963 Ambassador's shape was much tighter, cleaner, and smoother, with almost all of its parts interchangeable between it and the new Classic. All Ambassadors used unitized structure instead of the more rattle-prone, traditional body-on-frame construction, which was still the industry standard. In 1963, AMC's new  wheelbase cars (Ambassadors and Classics) used a revolutionary method of unit construction, which has since been almost universally adopted by automobile manufacturers. AMC Ambassador and Classics used outer panels stamped from single sheet metal panels that included both door frames and outer rocker panels. This resulted in an extremely rigid and rattle-free structure, better fit of doors into frames, production cost savings as well as reduced noise, vibration, and harshness. The "uniside" structure was superior to the conventional production methods in which multiple smaller pieces were welded together.

Curved side glass and push-button door handles were new and costly upgrades, but contributed to the new Rambler's handsome, elegant, and modern Mercedes-like bodyside styling, by adding greater elegance in detail. At the time, curved side glass was used exclusively in a few much more expensive luxury cars. The design feature increased interior room and visibility, as well as reduced wind noise and improved proportions and styling of the cars. The Ambassador also featured a squared-off Thunderbird-type roofline. The front end featured a forward-thrusting upper and lower ends with a vertical bar "electric shaver" chrome grille insert. The Ambassador's grille was differentiated from the Classic's grille by its use of the Ambassador name in script within the small horizontal bar between the upper and lower grille sections. Round quad headlights were slightly recessed in chrome bezels mounted side by side within the grille at its outermost edges. Overall, the new Ambassadors were described by the staff of Automotive Fleet magazine as "probably the finest looking cars ever produced by American Motors".

Ambassadors were again available in 2-door coupe, 4-door sedan, and 5-door wagon body styles, but new trim lines debuted. A "Mercedes-like three-number model designation was developed" with the 800 as the Ambassador's base trim model (replacing the previous year's Super model) for the police, taxi, and fleet market, a 880 model (in place of the Custom), and the up-level 990 trim (replacing the previous 400 models).

The 1963 Ambassadors were offered only with the  V8, in either  2-barrel or  4-barrel versions. AMC's smaller  V8 engine was only offered in the Classic line. The automatic transmission was controlled by a steering column-mounted lever, replacing the previous pushbutton system.

Sales were brisk, and the redesign was billed a success, with Motor Trend Magazine bestowing Car of the Year status on the entire 1963 Rambler line, including the Ambassador. The marketing formula for the Ambassador generated record sales for the model with buyers favoring more luxury and features as evidenced by the Ambassador 990 models outselling the 880 versions by nearly 2-to-1, while the base 800 model was less popular and had a total of 43 two-door sedans built for the year. The automaker did not have the resources of GM, Ford, and Chrysler, nor the sales volume to spread out its new model tooling and advertising costs over large production volumes; however, Richard Teague "turned these economical cars into smooth, streamlined beauties with tons of options and V-8 pep".

1964 

The 1964 model year introduced minor trim changes and new options for the Ambassador line as AMC's emphasis was on the transformed Rambler American compact-sized models. The "electric-shaver" grille on the 1963 model was replaced with a flush-mounted design, and the engine and transmission options were widened. A two-door hardtop body style called 990-H was added for the first time since 1957. The base 880 models were dropped from the line.

The 1964 Ambassadors featured the  2-barrel  V8 as standard, with the 4-barrel  version as optional. The automaker did not offer a 4-speed manual transmission to compete with the sporty mid-size V8 offerings from Ford or GM. Instead, AMC offered its innovative "Twin-Stick" manual transmission. The "Twin-stick" option consisted of a three-speed manual transmission, operated by one of the two console-mounted "sticks" in conjunction with an overdrive unit that was controlled by the second "stick" in both 2nd and 3rd gears. This gave the driver the option of using five forward gears.

The 990-H was the most luxurious two-door model and included the high-compression  V8 as well as a specially trimmed interior featuring 2+2-style bucket seats, center armrests front and rear, as well as a console with the Twin-Stick manual or available automatic transmission. Approximately 2,955 units were built.

Rambler Marquesa 

The Rambler Marquesa was exhibited at auto shows during the 1964 model year and its existence was later unknown. However, the Ambassador 990-H based show car remained in its original condition and is now on display at the Rambler Ranch in Elizabeth, Colorado, the most comprehensive collection of Nash, Rambler, and AMC vehicles and their history. The two-door hardtop is finished with special paint colors with a darker roof, wire wheel covers, and dual striped whitewall tires. The interior features matching shade of brocade upholstery on the bucket seats that continues on the headliner and the door panel trim. The center console housed the automatic transmission shifter as well as the centrally-located power window switches.

Fifth generation

1965 

No matter how much success the new Ramblers achieved in the marketplace, Roy Abernethy was not completely satisfied. Using the experience he gained as an outstanding salesman as a guide, Abernethy closely looked at the direction that American Motors' competition was going and decided that the company would be much more successful if its products competed more directly with the Big Three. He would achieve this by pushing all AMC vehicles further upmarket among the various market segments, shaking off the company's economy car image, and offering vehicles once again in all three major American car size classes: compact, intermediate, and full-size. The American and Classic were strong competitors in the former two segments, so for the 1965 model year, he set his sights on turning the Ambassador into a proper full-size car by stretching the Classic's wheelbase and giving it different styling. The general sizes of automobiles at that time were based on wheelbase length standards that were set by the industry, rather than the modern vehicle classification by interior and cargo space. The 1965 Ambassador represented a fundamental shift in corporate ideology, a shift away from primarily fuel-efficient vehicles, to bigger, faster, and potentially more profitable cars.

Although the Ambassador rode the same platform as its 1963–64 forebears, the 1965 models looked all-new. American Motors' designer Dick Teague styled the 1965 Ambassador with panache and gave the car an overall integrated look. Motor Trend magazine agreed, calling it a "strikingly handsome automobile". The overall linear design look could be described as "chunky" or "chiseled".

All Ambassadors were built on a  wheelbase, or  longer than the Classic models. Teague extended the beltline level from the stacked quad headlights to the vertical taillights to visually stretch the cars. The Ambassador featured longer, squared-off rear fenders with vertical wrap-around taillights, taller trunk lid, squared-off rear bumper-mounted low, and squarer rear wheel arches. At the front, the Ambassador again sparked minor controversy with its new vertically stacked quad headlights, which were slightly recessed in their bezels, as they flanked an all-new horizontal bar grille. This new wall-to-wall grille projected forward, horizontally, in the center, to create an effect somewhat opposite to the 1963's grille treatment. 

The front-end design provided a bold, rugged appearance. Overall. the new Ambassadors were as attractive as anything built by AMC's Detroit-based competitors, and with a list price of around $3,000, few could quibble about the cost of ownership.

As was the case before 1962, the Ambassador's entire extra wheelbase was ahead of the cowl, meaning that interior volume was the same as the intermediate-sized Classic. Another new body style debuted in the Ambassador lineup for 1965: an attractive new convertible offered as part of the 990 series. This was the first time a convertible was offered in the Ambassador line since 1948.

Ambassador body styles (except station wagons with three rows of seats and the 990-H hardtop) offered seating for six passengers, with coupes and convertibles having the option of buckets seats with a center console and floor shifter. The Ambassador 990-H was a premium two-door hardtop model, available only in 5-passenger form with standard bucket seats featuring fold-down center armrests in both the front and back.

Ambassadors also saw an expanded list of trim lines, convenience options, and engine choices. Interiors were redesigned and featured a new dashboard. The 990 and 990-H models were continued, while 880 models were the new economy leaders in the 1965 Ambassador line, but even the $2,512 price for the two-door sedan was not attractive compared to the models with better trim, buckets seats, and special interiors. Ambassadors came standard with AMC's new  Inline-6 engine, which was the first time since 1956 that an Ambassador was available with six cylinders. Far more popular in the Ambassador, however, were the two time-tested  AMC V8 engines.

American Motors' management decided that the Ambassador could once again accept a standard six-cylinder engine, since its full-size competitors (e. g. Bel Air and Impala, Ford Custom 500 and Galaxie, as well as Plymouth Fury) came with six-cylinder engines as standard equipment. They, therefore, appealed to a wider range of customers than the Ambassador was getting. Also, since the Classic was now smaller and styled differently, the Ambassador six-cylinder would not threaten to cannibalize Classic 6 sales, which were the company's sales volume leaders. The changes were on target as sales of the repositioned Ambassador more than tripled.

The standard six-cylinder engine now featured larger valves making them the same as on the V8s. The front seatbacks were redesigned to offer additional legroom for rear-seat passengers with the popular reclining front seats now having 7 positions, compared to the 5 before. New Bendix disc brakes with power assist were now optional.

Popular Mechanics classified the Ambassadors as family cars describing the prototypes as solid, comfortable, and running "majestically". Motor Trend magazine tested an Ambassador convertible with a Twin-Stick overdrive transmission and found it commendably economical, averaging  over  run, and noting that ... "Traveling comfort was the Ambassador's biggest selling point, along with its exceptionally powerful Bendix duo-servo drum brakes ...With the thin bucket seats that recline, driver and passengers can enjoy a high degree of riding comfort... Many passers-by commented on the car's good looks... Our summary: a nice, comfortable, quiet, well built family automobile that rather neglects the performance market."

Tom Magliozzi, one of the brothers hosting the Car Talk radio talk show owned a black 1965 AMC Ambassador convertible that he called my "sleek black beauty" and wanted another one when asked "if you could have any car, new or old, what it would be?

Production numbers

 6585-5 990 4-door sedan: 24,852
 6587-5 990 2-door convertible: 3499
 6588-5 990 Station Wagon: 8701
 6589-5 990 2-door hardtop: 5034
 6589-7 990H 2-door hardtop: 6382

Rambler Attaché 
American Motors campaigned the Rambler Attaché, a specially prepared Ambassador convertible, for the auto show circuit. It was finished in deep-indigo pearlescent paint with red body side pinstripes and the car rode on chrome wire wheels. The hood ornament featured a "crown-like Ambassador crest" while the interior's bucket seats were upholstered in indigo leather with ruby-red inserts.

1966 

For 1966, minor changes greeted the Ambassador range. The V-shaped horizontal louver spanned unbroken between the headlamps and the effect was continued with twin rectangular trim pieces attached to the side of the front fenders at their leading edges by the headlamps. The effect was repeated in the new vertical wraparound taillamps with the top-line models receiving a twin set of horizontal ribbed moldings across the back of the trunk lid that simulated the look of the front grille. Hardtop coupes received a redesigned roofline that was angular in appearance with angle-cut rear side windows and a rectangular rear window. The backlight no longer curved and wrapped slightly around the C-pillars. The changes made for a more "formal" notchback look that was popular at the time.

Station wagons also received a new roof (that did not have as pronounced dip over the rear cargo area) as well as a redesigned tailgate and optional simulated woodgrain exterior side panels. Available with two rows of seats with a standard bottom-hinged tailgate with electric, fully retracting rear window or with an optional rear-facing third-row that featured a left side-hinged rear door, with a regular exterior door handle on the right side. All station wagons carried a Cross Country badge.

The 880 served as the base model line. The two-door sedan was the price leader at $2,404, but finished with the least sales for the model year. The more popular and higher trimmed 990 models were available in sedan, wagon, hardtop, and convertible versions. Options included a vinyl roof, wire wheel covers, AM/FM radio, adjustable steering wheel, and cruise control. A new luxury DPL sub-model (short for "Diplomat") two-door hardtop debuted at the top of the range.

The DPL included special lower body side trim and numerous standard convenience items such as reclining bucket seats upholstered in brocade fabrics or optional vinyl. An optional interior trim featured houndstooth fabric and included two throw pillows. The DPL model was aimed to compete with the new, more upscale trimmed Plymouth VIP, Ford LTD, Chevrolet Caprice and Oldsmobile Cutlass Supreme.

The  I6, as well as the  V8s remained in the line, but transmission selections now included a new console-mounted four-speed manual. Most Ambassadors continued to be ordered with automatic transmissions.

Motor Trend magazine tested a 1966 DPL equipped with a 327 engine that "definitely has snap we hadn't felt before" and even with an automatic transmission experienced "healthy wheelspin from both rear wheels [because of the Twin-Grip limited-slip differential]... Subtle changes in this year's suspension, which include longer shocks and different springs, have a pronounced effect on the way the car feels and handles. Most welcome is the improved steering response. The car has a new feet-on-the-ground feeling, and body lean seems to have been reduced. The ride remains very good... As before, the interior's the outstanding feature of the Ambassador. Its quality is such that other luxury cars, even higher priced ones, could well imitate it...."

Perhaps the biggest change, however, was that the Ambassador lost its historic Rambler nameplate, as the car was now marketed as the "American Motors Ambassador" or "AMC Ambassador". Abernethy was again responsible for this marketing move, as he attempted to move the stylish new Ambassador even further upmarket. To him, that meant that the Rambler name and its economy car image would be eschewed to give the car a clean slate in a market that was turning away from a focus on economy and toward V8 performance. The evidence suggests that Abernethy was on the right track with moving the Ambassador upscale to compete with other manufacturers' luxury models as sales of the AMC's flagship jumped from 18,647 in 1964 to over 64,000 in 1965, and then in 1966, they went to more than 71,000. Although the Ambassador accounted for a mere fraction of total passenger car sales in the U.S., it was an important step in bringing AMC's products in line with what the consumer of the day wanted.

Sixth generation

1967 
American Motors introduced a completely restyled longer, lower, and wider Ambassador for the 1967 model year, now riding on a  wheelbase, or  longer than before. The Ambassador's platform was  longer than the new Rambler Rebel's  wheelbase. The Ambassador was positioned in the standard-size category, against traditional big cars such as Ford Galaxie, Chevrolet Impala, and Plymouth Fury. The convertible was offered again—this time in DPL trim—for 1967; but this would be the final year with 1,260 built. It featured an all-new "split stack" folding mechanism with concealed side rails that did not intrude into the backseat area, thus offering room for three adult passengers in the rear.

The car once again looked completely new, with a more rounded appearance that sported sweeping rooflines, "coke-bottle" fenders, greater glass area, and a recessed grille that bowed forward less than that of the 1965–66 models. Taillights were wider, rectangular, and divided by one central vertical bar. Motor Trend magazine described the all-new styling of the new Ambassador as "attractive" and "more graceful and easier on the eye in '67".

The 880 two-door sedans featured the identical roofline as the hardtops, but had slim B-pillars that gave them a more open-air coupe appearance and were marketed as "Sports Sedans". The 880 was also available in 4-door sedan and station wagon versions, but more popular were the better equipped and more upscale 990 models in 4-door sedan, station wagon, and 2-door hardtop body styles. Adding more elegance to DPL two-door hardtops and convertibles was the optional "Satin-Chrome" finish (paint code P-42) for the lower body side replacing the standard full-length stainless steel rocker moldings. A black or white vinyl cover was optional on 990 and DPL sedans and hardtops. The 990 Cross Country station wagons were available with 3M's "Di-noc" simulated wood-grain body side panels trimmed in a slim stainless steel frame.

The full-sized Ambassador featured a lengthy list of standard features and options. The interiors "rival more expensive cars for luxury and quality, yet are durable enough to take years of normal wear". The premium materials and fittings included wood-grain trim and even an optional "Custom" package with special upholstery and two matching pillows. Ambassador DPL hardtops included reclining bucket seats with a center armrest between them (with a center cushion for a third occupant or a floor console with gear selector), as well as a foldaway center armrest for the rear seat. The new safety-oriented instrument panel grouped all gauges and controls in front of the driver, with the rest of the dashboard pushed forward and away from the passengers. Focusing on safety, there were now no protruding knobs, the steering column was designed to collapse under impact, and the steering wheel was smaller than previous Ambassadors.

The long-lived "GEN-1" family of AMC V8 engines was replaced by an all-new line of  engines that debuted for 1966 in the Rambler American. These V8s were an all-new design featuring a thin-wall-casting block, heads, and manifold. The old torque tube design was eliminated by a new four-link, trailing-arm rear suspension system providing a more comfortable coil spring ride.

American Motors promoted the new 1967 Ambassador as an "uncompromising automobile with the red carpet ride" in print advertisements, as well as in an innovative TV commercial. Unfortunately, sales of the redesigned models were disappointing, due to customer confusion caused by the entire company's abrupt upmarket push, which seemed uncomfortably "me too" to the traditional domestic Big Three's customers and they also alienated American Motors' loyal buyer base. Abernethy's ideas of entering new markets were not working. These strategy changes resulted in a new round of financial problems for American Motors. Because of this, Abernathy was released from AMC by its board of directors later that year and was replaced by William V. Luneberg and Roy D. Chapin, Jr.

USPS sedans

 
American Motors provided specialized fleet options for commercial and municipal customers. Taxi and police versions were heavily used and not available to the general public. A purchase order was made by the General Services Administration (GSA) of 3,745 Ambassador base 880 four-door sedans for use by the United States Postal Service (USPS), most to be built in factory right-hand-drive. There were six vehicles for review for this purchase and tested was a left-hand drive AMC Ambassador 880 sedan with its back seat removed.

Not all of the units ordered for the postal service had right-hand drive. Specifications included factory heavy-duty fleet options such as rubber floor mats, upholstery, and the deletion of the rear seat. Most came with the base  I6 engine along with column-shift automatic transmission and "Twin-Grip" (limited-slip differential). All came with an identification metal plate on the dash near the ashtray.

American Motors took advantage of this large fleet order in its marketing for the Ambassadors. Print advertisements in popular magazines headlined "We Deliver" and described that Ambassadors will provide safety, reliability, and a "red-carpet" ride.

The engineering to make the cars right-hand-drive served as the template for other American Motors vehicles based on the Ambassador platform destined for foreign right-hand-drive markets such as Australia, New Zealand, and the United Kingdom. The Rambler Rebel and its replacement AMC Matador were thereafter built using the same RHD dash, steering, and instrumentation as the 1967 USPS Ambassador sedans, for both built-up export to the United Kingdom and for the knock-down kits supplied for local assembly in Australia and New Zealand. The Matador was built in Australia until 1976 in this way.

AMC Marlin 
The fastback Marlin two-door hardtop that was previously built on the Rambler Classic platform in 1965 and 1966, was continued for 1967, but was now based on the larger Ambassador platform. It featured the Ambassador's front end, longer hood, and luxury appointments with an even longer fastback roofline than the previous version.

1968 

For the 1968 model year, a new SST trim line was placed above the now mid-line DPL trim for the Ambassador. American Motors was a pioneer in the field of air conditioning through its Kelvinator refrigerator division, and AMC's marketing chief Bill McNealy wanted to make the Ambassador stand out in a crowded market segment and decided to add greater distinction to the Ambassador line by making the All Weather A/C system as standard equipment. This was the first time any volume car manufacturer had done so, something that even Cadillac and Lincoln had not offered on their luxury cars – although some of them were priced at more than twice as much as Ambassador. While all Ambassadors came with air conditioning as standard, consumers could order the car without air as a "delete option" and decrease the price by $218. As AMC pointed out in their advertising campaign for the Ambassador, the only other major automaker that offered air conditioning as standard equipment on its cars in 1968 was Rolls-Royce. Air conditioning was standard only on Cadillac limousines.

Because of slow sales during the 1967 model year, both the convertible and the pillared coupe models were dropped from the line for 1968, leaving the 990 hardtop coupe and sedan, the DPL hardtop coupe, sedan, and wagon, and the new SST hardtop coupe and sedan in the Ambassador line. The personal luxury fastback Marlin was also discontinued to make way for the smaller new AMC Javelin in the pony car segment. The top-of-the-line 1968 Ambassador SST version was "especially appealing" and "a very luxurious package" with standard V8 power, air conditioning, expensive upholstery, individual reclining front seats, wood-look interior trim, upgraded exterior trim, as well as numerous conveniences such as an electric clock and a headlights-on buzzer.

Styling changes were minor. Taillights were now recessed in body-color bezels that were divided by a single central horizontal bar. Front headlight bezels were now made of nylon and similarly body-colored. A new injection-molded ABS plastic grille was dominated by a horizontal bar that extended forward in the center from the sides, while its outline had squared off edges that wrapped forward into the inner headlight extensions. Fender-mounted marker lights were added at the front and rear as standard equipment, as the U.S. National Highway Traffic Safety Administration (NHTSA) regulations mandated their application (along with seat belts beginning January 1, 1968) to all passenger cars sold in the United States for 1968.

However, AMC's most enduring styling feature debuted on the Ambassador for 1968, as flush-mounted paddle-style door handles replaced the former push-button units on all American Motors cars, save the Rambler American. The practical and "disarmingly simple design" predated safety-related mandates and industry norms. The interior locking was no longer by the traditional windowsill pushbutton, but a lever set into the armrest.

Front-wheel alignment was made easier with and with greater accuracy by moving the camber adjustment from the upper to the lower control arm on the double wishbone suspension, and the caster angle adjustments also moved from the upper control arm to the drag strut. At midyear, AMC's new top engine, the AMX   V8 became an option in the Ambassador line, bringing the total engine options up to four.

In June 1967, American Motors started a new advertising campaign created by Mary Wells Lawrence of the Wells, Rich, and Greene marketing agency. The US$12 million AMC account was high-profile assignment and helped established the agency as innovative and daring in its approach. The new advertising violated the convention of not attacking the competition, and AMC's campaigns became highly controversial. The publicity worked with AMC's total retail sales improving 13% for the fiscal year, but 1968 Ambassador numbers were slightly down.

Seventh generation

1969 

In 1969, the Ambassador received a major restyling, with a  gain in overall length and wheelbase. The front end appearance was revised with new quad headlight clusters mounted horizontally in a new molded plastic grille. The grille itself was blackout with a chrome horizontal bar that connected the headlight clusters. The hood was redesigned to accommodate the grille's raised center portion, and it faintly recalled Packard's classic grille/hood combination. Dick Teague, AMC's Vice President of Styling, had worked at the luxury car manufacturer before joining AMC. Parking lights were rectangular and mounted horizontally in recessed wells in the front bumper, just beneath each set of headlights. The entire front fascia leaned forward slightly to lend an air of forward motion to the car's appearance.

At the rear, ribbed rectangular taillights were mounted inboard the Ambassador's rearward-thrusting rear fenders. Square ribbed marker lights of similar height were mounted at the trailing edge of each fender side. The deck lid had a slightly higher lift-over for cargo access. The base and DPL models had no decorative panel connecting the taillights while the top-line SST versions featured a panel painted red to match the taillights. Station wagons saw vertical wraparound taillights replacing the previous "hooded" units, which were not visible from the side. The 1969 AMC Ambassador was a smooth, powerful, well-proportioned sedan that did not look like anything else on the road.

The interiors were upgraded and a new deeply hooded dashboard clustered instruments and controls in front of the driver. There was an increased emphasis on luxury-type trim and features by buyers. The base model two-door hardtop Ambassador was no longer offered for the 1969 model year.

The 1969 Ambassador stressed luxury, with the marketing tagline developed by Mary Wells Lawrence at the Wells Rich Greene agency, tying the car's value, "It will remind you of the days when money really bought something." The combination of rich velour upholstery, individually adjustable reclining seats, standard air conditioning, and the longer wheelbase were highlighted in advertisements with Ambassador's posh"limousine" ride at an economical price. One aspect of this new advertising theme included many AMC dealers inviting prospective customers to call and request a "demonstration ride", in which a uniformed chauffeur would arrive at the prospect's home and drive them around in an Ambassador SST sedan. AMC's efforts worked, and Ambassador sales increased again.

Royale Stretch Limo 

Not only did AMC promote the 1969 Ambassador as having a "limousine" ride and deluxe appointments, but Chicago auto leasing executive, Robert Estes, had the Armbruster/Stageway Company convert Ambassadors into real  limousines riding on a  wheelbase. Known as the Royale Stretch Limo, one was owned by the State of Wisconsin as the official vehicle for Governor Warren Knowles. The conversions were unusual in that they did not keep the stock rear doors—as is typical in most limos. The back doors were welded shut and the Ambassadors were lengthened by inserting a section just behind the original B-pillar that had an entirely new central door in this center making a large opening for entry and egress.  steel "I-beams" bridge the expanse created by the stretch. Power comes from the "AMX"   V8 engine backed with the BorgWarner automatic transmission and a "Twin-Grip" limited-slip differential with 3.15 gears.

1970 

For the 1970 model year, the rear half of Ambassador hardtop coupes and sedans were treated to an overhaul that was also shared by the intermediate 1970 AMC Rebel. On hardtop coupes, this restyling resulted in a sloping roofline that saw upswept reverse-angle quarter windows. The beltline kicked up at the point the hardtop's rear windows swept upward, and tapered back to the fender end, meeting a new loop-type rear bumper.

On sedans, the roofline featured slimmer C-pillar, squared-off rear door windows, and it met a beltline that kicked up beneath the trailing edge of each rear door window. The beltline tapered back to the same rear fascia as on the two-door hardtops. This rear fascia contained a new ribbed taillight lens that stretched wall-to-wall and included twin square white reverse light lenses in its center.

Station wagons received no change to their rooflines, doors, and rear fascias. However, all Ambassadors received a new extruded aluminum grille at the front, featuring several widely spaced bright horizontal bars with one wide, body-colored horizontal grille bar extending to each headlight cluster. New "turbine" themed wheel covers were introduced and would remain through 1974.

The  V8 was replaced for 1970 by a new  V8 engine. The  V8 was also supplanted by a  engine available in either 2-barrel, regular gasoline, or high-output, 4-barrel, premium fuel versions.

1971 

Following the previous year's redesign, the 1971 Ambassadors received minor changes and improvements. The marketing tagline for the year was the underdog asking, "If you had to compete with GM, Ford and Chrysler, what would you do?" — that was answered by AMC including more features, advantages, and benefits for buyers of its cars compared to the models from its much larger competitors. This was reflected by shuffling the Ambassador models for 1971 and by including more equipment in the standard feature list. The previously nameless base models were dropped, as the sedan-only DPL trim line was relegated to base model status, and a new top-line Brougham trim line was added above mid-line SST models. Both the SST and Brougham versions came as two-door hardtops as well as four-door sedans and station wagons.

The DPL came with AMC's new   Inline-6 with seven main bearings. BorgWarner's "Shift-Command" automatic transmissions were standard equipment across the line. Two of AMC's  were optional; an 8.5:1 compression version with a two-barrel carburetor or a high-compression four-barrel V8 that required premium-fuel. The previous "AMX 390" V8 gave way to a new   V8 as the top engine option.

Styling changes consisted of a new fascia for the front. It featured headlights contained in their own chrome pods separate from, but flanking the new grille with a bright rectangular surround, with rounded edges. The "natural" cast pot metal grille insert was recessed and featured a bright vertical bar pattern. A second set of parking lights was added outboard of the headlight clusters, and they were integrated into the fender extension to eliminate the need for separate front marker lights.

Taillights on hardtop coupes and sedans still ran wall-to-wall, but the twin backup lights were moved from the center to further outboard—approximately eight inches in from either fender side. Once again, the wagon received few changes at the rear, but added a new design for its optional woodgrain side trim, which filled in its upper bodysides. Its lower edge flowed downward aft of its peak at the leading edge above each front wheelhouse, in a similar fashion as the Buick Skylark's side "sweep spear" styling cue.

Ambassador base models were offered to fleet buyers with various police, taxicab, and other heavy-duty packages. Governments and police departments in the U.S. historically used standard-size, low-price line four-door sedans. Equipped with the 360 or 401 engines, the base Ambassadors saw use as police cruisers and support vehicles.

1972 

Minor changes greeted 1972 Ambassadors, as AMC's biggest news for the year was the addition of the innovative AMC Buyer Protection Plan, which included the industry's first 12-month or  bumper-to-bumper warranty. This was the first time an automaker promised to repair anything wrong with the car (except for tires) and owners were provided with a toll-free telephone number to the company, as well as a free loaner car if a warranty repair took overnight. This backing also included mechanical upgrades to increase durability and quality, such as the standardization of electric windshield wipers on all model lines, replacing AMC's vacuum-powered units, as well as better interior trims. By focusing on quality, the smallest domestic automaker was profitable in 1972, earning US$30.2 million (the highest net profit achieved by AMC since 1964) on $4 billion in sales.

The base Ambassador DPL model was canceled, with three body styles now available in SST and Brougham trim. Fleet purchasers could order plain Ambassadors in Police Pursuit Vehicle (PPV) or Special Service Package (SSP) versions. A six-cylinder engine was no longer available; thus, Ambassador became an exclusively V8-engined car for the first time since 1964. This made the Ambassador the only volume-produced American car that included air conditioning, power brakes, automatic transmission as well as a V8 engine as standard equipment; all while being priced less than the Big Three's full-sized cars. The engines were designed to operate on regular-grade, low-lead, or unleaded types of gasoline. All were based on the engine designs responsible for AMC winning the 1971–1972 Trans-Am Series. The BorgWarner transmission was replaced by the "Torque-Command" (TorqueFlite) three-speed automatic sourced from Chrysler.

Styling changes on the 1972 Ambassador were minimal and consisted of a new crosshatch cast metal grille with bright trim and new integrated fender extension mounted side marker lamps on the front. Brougham station wagons included a roof rack, rear air deflector, as well as 3M "Di-noc" woodgrain trim on body sides and tailgate.

A Popular Mechanics magazine survey after driving a total of  found Ambassador owners were pleased with their cars, describing them to be "very comfortable to drive and ride in" with handling listed as a top "specific like" by half of the drivers. A very high percentage (92%) would buy one again. Although the Buyer Protection Plan was listed by only 8.5% as a reason to buy an Ambassador, owners valued the smaller AMC dealers that "had more time to be courteous and to pay personal attention to customers".

1973 

The SST models were dropped from the line, as all 1973 Ambassadors now came in one high-level "Brougham" trim. Ten popular items including an AM radio, power disk brakes, tinted glass, and whitewall tires were added to the already extensive standard equipment list that included air conditioning, V8 engine, and automatic transmission. The Ambassador line "maintains its reputation as one of the industry's most completely equipped cars". The automaker's marketing campaign shifted to stress quality in a "we back them better because we build them better" advertising with particular emphasis into the Hornet, Matador and Gremlin promotion, while the Ambassador received got individual support with the tagline "you get standard equipment, the luxuries you'd normally have to pay extra for." Model year production for AMC increased 25 percent, outperforming the industry average production increase by 75 percent, with only a slightly changed product in the showrooms.

In range rationalization to a single trim available in two-door hardtop, four-door sedan, and station wagon body versions, the styling changes for the 1973 Ambassadors were minimal. Heftier front and rear bumpers were included to comply with new U.S. National Highway Traffic Safety Administration (NHTSA) regulations that required all passenger cars to withstand a  front and a  rear impacts without damage to the engine, lights, and safety equipment. Ambassadors complied with the regulation by incorporating a stronger front bumper equipped with self-restoring telescoping shock absorbers. This bumper also featured a more prominent horizontal rubber guard at its upper portion near the grille, thus eliminating the need for a pair of vertical chrome bumper guards that were optional before. The rear bumper gained vertical black rubber bumper guards that also replaced a pair of similar and previously optional chrome bumper guards. The grille gained heavier horizontal bars and headlight bezels took on blackout trim in their recessed portions.

Eighth generation

1974 

Ambassador sales had remained steady since 1970, despite the lack of major changes to the vehicle. The 1974 models were restyled and stretched  to accommodate energy-absorbing bumpers in both front and rear. The redesign made them the lognest AMC-built versions at  just as the 1973 Arab Oil Embargo sparked nationwide gasoline rationing.

The 1974 Ambassador Brougham was no longer available as a 2-door (pillar-less) hardtop, leaving the 4-door sedan and station wagon body styles. The hardtop's cancellation was due in part to the low sales volume of the Ambassador 2-door versions, as well as the introduction of the 1974 Matador coupe, which received the Car and Driver "Best Styled Car of 1974", featuring a long hood and short rear deck design that avoided (at least on introduction) period hallmarks such as imitation landau bars and opera lights.

Styling changes for the Ambassador sedan and wagon included revised front fender caps as well as an all-new hood, grille, bumpers, rear fascia, instrument panel, interior trim, hood ornament, and a changing font for the Ambassador nameplate. The grille showed off a new squared-off loop-type design surrounding the circular recessed quad headlights and featured a forward-protruding center. The insert held a crosshatch pattern dominated by two thick horizontal bars that connected the headlight bezels and contained new parking lights between them. These parking lights had amber lenses, followed the grille protrusion forward, and were overlaid by the grille's crosshatch trim. Headlamp bezels were once again blacked out in their recessed areas. The new hood and front bumper followed the grille's central protrusion forward, giving the car a slight "coffin nose" look. The revised Matador sedan saw a similar frontal treatment in 1974, but with a much more pronounced effect and with different single headlamp clusters, hood, and grille inserts.

As with the new Matador sedan, the new rear bumper was much larger and backed by shock absorbers, as it was beefed up to comply with new National Highway Traffic Safety Administration regulations for standardized front and rear bumpers on passenger cars that could sustain a  impact with no damage. Sedan rear fenders received fiberglass caps that wrapped inward to create a recessed space that met a carryover decklid. In this space were mounted the new rectangular taillight housings, which featured taller white backup lights mounted inboard of the new taillights. The license plate moved from the rear bumper to the area between the new taillight assemblies, and the whole taillight and license plate system on the sedans was surrounded by its own loop of chrome trim. Both Ambassador and Matador sedans shared the same rear-end styling.

The cargo area and the rear design of station wagons remained similar to previous Ambassadors, save for a massive new bumper and revised taillamps. The wagon was available with two-row bench seats for six passengers or with a rear-facing third row for a total of eight seat-belted passengers. All came with numerous practical, appearance, and comfort items as standard equipment. These included a two-way opening tailgate: (1) hinged at the bottom for convenient loading or hauling long cargo and (2) hinged at the side to open like a door for ease of entry and exit for passengers or cargo; wood-grained semi-transparent vinyl side and rear trim, a full-length roof rack; as well as a chrome and wood grain roof air deflector to help keep the tailgate window clean. However, it was possible to order the station wagon without the 3M "Di-noc" exterior body trim.

Powertrain selections remained the same as in 1973, with only V8 engines and automatic transmissions available. When ordered with a trailer package (special wiring harness with heavy-duty flasher and heavy-duty suspension with rear sway bar), the Ambassador was rated for up to  towing capacity. Other increases for 1974 included a larger capacity fuel tank, and an alternator producing 62 amperes. New sound insulation made the Ambassador even quieter. All came with a very lengthy list of standard equipment that was typically optional on competing makes. These included comfort items such as air conditioning, an AM radio, and a vanity mirror as well as appearance enhancements such as pin striping and whitewall tires.

Sales of all full-size vehicles, regardless of the automaker, fell significantly in 1974 as America's focus shifted to smaller cars. By the end of the model year, the full-sized, low-priced market segment dropped 37%. Ambassador sales were no different. The demand for AMC Gremlins and Hornets was increasing since 1971 and the automaker was unable to keep up making the smaller models by 1974. It was also getting ready to introduce the Pacer. To simplify its production and number of different models, during June 1974, the final AMC Ambassador rolled off the Kenosha, Wisconsin assembly line, ending a nameplate that had been in continuous production in some form for 48 years.

Production consisted of 17,901 sedans and 7,070 station wagons for a total of 24,971 Ambassadors during 1974.

International assembly

Argentina

Industrias Kaiser Argentina (IKA) produced the U.S. third, fourth, and fifth generation Ambassadors in Córdoba, Argentina from 1962 until 1972, and later available by special order through 1975. Despite being replaced by AMC in 1967, IKA continued to use the old platform until the end of production in Argentina. As with all export markets the cars were marketed as "Rambler" even after the name change in the United States.

Assembly of IKA Ramblers began in 1962, with the Argentinean cars being the 1961 U.S. versions, but equipped with  Continental I6 engines producing  at 4000 rpm, along with a steering column-mounted manual three-speed transmission. The Ambassador 440 was the top-trim IKA model available only as a four-door sedan.

The completely new generation models by AMC in the U.S. for the 1963 model year were also replicated by IKA. The Ambassador sedan came exclusively in 990 trim and it revolutionized the Argentine automotive market by introducing innovations that included power steering, power windows, and factory-installed air conditioning.

The Ambassador line was redesigned for 1965 in the U.S., as well as for Argentina. All IKA Rambler models now featured the  overhead camshaft (OHC) straight-six "Tornado Interceptor" engines producing  at 4200 rpm. They were originally developed by Kaiser Motors in the U.S. for the 1963 Jeep Gladiator pickups and Wagoneer vehicles. The engine was now produced in Argentina and it increased the domestic (locally sourced) content of IKA automobiles to lower taxes (tariffs).

The new IKA Ambassador 990 sedans were further upgraded to steering column-mounted ZF four-speed manual transmissions, front disk brakes, front reclining bucket seats with center cushion and armrest, as well as luxury features that included power windows and air conditioning. A road test by Revista Parabrisas described the 1965 IKA Rambler Ambassador 990 as "soft, opulent, and smooth ride at all speeds... something big, luxurious and complete... the highest expression of comfort tested so far by the magazine".

Stretch versions of the IKA Rambler Ambassador were used as official government limousines. The "Presidential" models featured a longer rear door and side window, as well as broader C-pillar with padded vinyl roof cover and a small rear window.

Australia

Australian Motor Industries (AMI) obtained the rights to assemble and distribute Ramblers in 1960, starting with the Rambler Ambassador. The 1961, 1962, and 1963 model year Ambassadors were built in Australia at AMI's facilities at Port Melbourne, Victoria. The 1961 sedan, which was powered by a  V8, was the most powerful car being assembled in Australia at that time. Knock-down kits featuring right-hand drive were shipped from Kenosha for assembly by AMI. The Australian-built Ambassadors included a significant percentage of "local content" to gain import tariff (tax) concessions by using parts and components (such as interiors and upholstery) that were sourced from Australian manufacturers. AMI's first year of production resulted in 65 registrations for 1961. Registrations of the 1963 model continued into 1964 with a total of 21 Ambassadors registered for 1964.

Although not documented by AMI records, it is concluded that 20 right-hand drive 1970 Ambassadors were fully imported from Kenosha, apparently 16 two-door hardtops and 4 four-door sedans. One possible reason for this was that it may have been a holding action while AMI was preparing for the assembly of the new 1970 Rebel. All were fitted with AMC's new  V8 and automatic transmission with floor shift.

The dash and instrument pack of the 1967 Ambassador, which had been converted and used in the RHD Ambassadors assembled for the U.S Postal Service, was thereafter used in all assembly kits for the Rebel and Matador and all factory-right hand drive Rebels, Matadors, and Ambassadors exported to the United Kingdom.

Costa Rica
Rambler vehicles were marketed in Costa Rica since 1959 through Purdy Motor. New local content regulations enacted during the 1960s effectively required vehicles sold in those markets to be assembled from knock-down kits. An assembly plant for Rambler and Toyota vehicles was established, ECASA, and the first Ramblers were produced in Costa Rica by the end of 1965. The company built Ambassadors and other AMC models through 1970, with Toyota increasing ownership of ECASA.

Mexico
American Motors' first-generation Ambassadors were exported to Mexico in the first half of 1958 and assembled locally in the second half of the same year and in 1959 by Planta Reo de México based in Monterrey, Nuevo León. The model was restricted to the four-door hardtop sedan. It was powered by the four-barrel  V8 engine producing  coupled to a three-speed automatic transmission. The model became the marque's top-of-the-line product alongside the three versions of the midsize Rambler and compact Rambler American models.

However, low sales figures alongside a deteriorating relationship between AMC and Planta REO lead to the cancellation of the contract in the second half of 1959.

American Motors once again exported its products into Mexico with a new local partner, Willys Mexicana. The agreement was signed in March 1960 and production began in Mexico City.

This meant the discontinuation of the Ambassador line in Mexico as the new operation had several priorities above offering a top-end luxury full-size car line. Aside from offering the already existing Jeep line, Willys Mexicana focused efforts on the compact Rambler American, which obtained a generation change just the next year, meaning a complete retooling of the Vallejo plant. In 1962, legal and industrial requirements in the country became stronger with the auto industry integration decree issued by the president Adolfo López Mateos in 1962. Among its mandates, it fully banned the importation of automobile engines. Willys Mexicana began building its own engine plant, which was achieved in November 1964. Once the Rambler American was consolidated in the Mexican market, Willys Mexicana opted to expand the product line by introducing the brand-new second-generation Rambler Classic midsize model as a larger luxury counterpart to the economy compact American. Also in 1963, due to problems with WM's parent company (the SOMEX bank) as well as further requirements of the government auto industry decree, Willys Mexicana was reorganized into an entirely new company with expanded capital and direct investment from the Mexican government, Kaiser Willys, and American Motors. This resulted in the formation of Vehiculos Automotores Mexicanos (VAM).

After the corporate transition process between 1960 and 1964 concluded, in which the Rambler marque under VAM surpassed the commercial results of its local predecessors Armadora Mexicana and Planta REO combined between 1950 and 1959, the company opted not to offer the Ambassador model. The Mexican market of the era was still relatively small and since the Ambassador shared mostly the same styling as the contemporary midsize model of the company, it was considered that internal competition would affect the sales of a simultaneous Rambler Classic/Ambassador line-up. Unlike the United States, which had a much larger and more diverse market for two different car lines with the same styling, AMC could offer a strong difference between both models with the exclusive V8 engine for the Ambassador and the Classic being restricted to six-cylinder engines. This advantage did not exist in Mexico since VAM could only produce six-cylinder engines in its Lerma plant and V8 engines could not be imported from AMC because of the 1962 decree. Instead, VAM opted to use the Rambler Classic as its most luxurious and flagship model, giving it the same treatment AMC put in the Ambassador model in the US and Canada. This would be passed on to the subsequent equivalent Rebel and Matador models produced under VAM.

The 1958–1959 Ambassador models represent the only chapter in this model's history to be present in Mexico. These were the only full-size American Motors products sold in the country, alongside the second generation 1974-1976 VAM Classic (Matador) models. It was also unique because it was a factory V8 model, the only AMC-based car marketed in Mexico with a V8 engine. All subsequent models produced by the VAM would be powered by six-cylinder engines.

International exports

Canada

AMC's Brampton Assembly Plant in Ontario, Canada had been building Rambler and AMC vehicles since 1962, including the Rambler Ambassador until 1968. From 1969 Canadian-market Ambassadors were imported directly from the United States. The Brampton plant continued to assemble AMC vehicles through the 1970s and 1980s with the additional exceptions of Javelin, Matador, and Pacer, which were also otherwise imported.

Finland
Ramblers were imported into Finland by two major Finnish automotive importers, Oy Voimavaunu Ab and Suomen Maanvilelijäin Kauppa Oy (SMK Group) during the 1950s and 1960s. From 1962 the Rambler brand was advertised in Finland as an "American success car". One could buy an Ambassador, Classic, or an American. From the mid-1960s, Wihuri Group, a large multi-sector family business, took over import operations using it's shipping operation, Autola Oy. Wihuri continued to import small numbers of AMC vehicles until 1975.

Germany
In 1969, American Motors did a deal with the Jaguar and Aston Martin importer for the Federal Republic of Germany, Peter Lindner GmbH in Frankfurt-Rödelheim. Peter Lindner became the sole distributor of AMC vehicles for West Germany, with the agreement to import seven AMC models including the AMC Ambassador. Peter Lindner continued to import AMC vehicles until 1977 after which German company Allrad Schmitt became the exclusive distributor for AMC passenger cars and Jeep.

New Zealand

American Motors' vehicles were assembled in New Zealand by VW Motors in Auckland until 1962, and Campbell Motor Industries (CMI) in Thames, North Island from 1964. CMI assembled the Rambler Classic and Rebel models from knock-down kits and also imported fully assembled factory-right-hand-drive vehicles direct from AMC. Although no Ambassadors were locally assembled by either operation, it is believed twelve 1970 factory-right-hand-drive Ambassadors were fully imported. 

These factory-built Ambassadors were built with the same dash, cluster, and instruments as the right-hand-drive kits used in Australian and New Zealand assembly of the AMC Rebel (and later Matador in Australia), themselves a reuse of the dash, cluster, and instruments of the right-hand-drive Ambassadors previously built for the United States Postal Service in 1967. Differences from these export models was that the dash, steering column, and steering wheel were color-matched to the interior, as with U.S models. These same parts provided for the Rebel/Matador assembly kits were otherwise only ever black.

Norway

Ramblers were imported into Norway during the 1950s and 1960s by Norwegian importer Kolberg Caspary Lautom AS located at Ås, Norway. KCL was formed in 1906 and imported automotive, industrial, and construction products. The Rambler Ambassador was imported in small numbers from 1963 until 1968. A total of 21 cars were brought in. KCL imported larger numbers of the Rambler American, Classic, and Rebel during the same period.

United Kingdom
Rambler Ambassadors were exported in limited numbers to the United Kingdom in factory right-hand-drive direct from AMC during the 1960s and up to its final year of 1974. They were imported by Rambler Motors (A.M.C) Ltd of Chiswick in West London, which had become a subsidiary of AMC in 1961. The location had previously been used since 1926 for British assembly of Hudson, Essex, and Terraplane vehicles. Before 1961, AMC vehicles were imported into the U.K by Nash Concessionaires, which was the former importer of pre-AMC Nash and post-AMC Rambler vehicles.

Right-hand-drive Ambassador models marketed in the UK were the Ambassador saloon (sedan), SST coupe, and station wagon. The one-year-only Ambassador convertible for 1967 was also sold. AMC vehicles were distributed by London distributors Clarke and Simpson Limited and were marketed as "the only American car built with RHD". As with all export markets, the UK models were marketed as "Rambler" even after the Rambler marque was dropped in the United States.

Kenosha-built right-hand-drive Ambassadors were built with the same 1967 Ambassador dash and double dials as right-hand-drive Rebels and Matadors assembled from knock-down kits in Australia and New Zealand. As with the Australian-built second-generation Matador, the UK-market Ambassador and Matador models built at Kenosha used the newer U.S. 1974 triple rectangular instrument dials in the older 1967 dash.

Epilogue 
Because AMC was focusing its attention on their newly acquired Jeep line, the redesigned 1974 Matador coupe, and the AMC Pacer, which would debut in 1975, the company would not put forth the investment to continue the full-size Ambassador line after its 1974 redesign. Instead, the automaker upgraded the Matador sedan and wagon counterparts starting with the 1975 model year. The basic automobile platform was used by AMC since the 1967 model year, and the full-size automobile market segment was declining. American Motors' strategy was now aimed at smaller cars and sport-utility vehicles.

However, the Ambassador basically continued as the similarly sized and styled Matador sedans and wagons. From 1975 they became available in uplevel "Brougham" trim and assumed the model numbers of the previously equivalent Ambassadors. The Matador was also offered in a unique top-of-the-line Barcelona four-door in its final year of production, 1978.

Notes

References

External links 

 AMC Rambler Club
 American Motors Owners Association
 Nash Car Club
 Nash Healey History
 Nash in the UK
 1967 Ambassador information
 
 

Ambassador
Sedans
Convertibles
Coupés
Station wagons
Mid-size cars
Full-size vehicles
Limousines
Police vehicles
Taxi vehicles
Rear-wheel-drive vehicles
1960s cars
1970s cars
Cars introduced in 1958